In Schenkerian theory, a scale-step is a triad (based on one of the diatonic scale degrees) that is perceived as an organizing force for a passage of music (in accordance with the principle of composing-out). In Harmony, Schenker gives the following example and asserts that 

A scale-step triad is designated by an uppercase Roman numeral representing the scale degree of the root, much as in traditional "harmonic analysis" (see chord progression). Thus, in the above example (which is in G major), the G major triad that Schenker claims we perceive through the first two measures would be labelled "I". However, unlike traditional harmonic analyses, Schenker's theory is not concerned with the mere labelling of such chords, but rather with discerning hierarchical relationships among tones. For Schenker, the chords occurring in a passage need not be of equal import. As he explains:

Furthermore, in terms of Schenker's mature theory, the question of whether a given triad possesses scale-step status depends on the structural level under discussion. Indeed, it follows from Schenker's concepts that, at the highest level, a tonal composition possesses only one scale step, since the entirety of the work may be understood as an elaboration of its tonic triad (i.e. scale-step I).

Notes

References

Schenkerian analysis